Hillel Day School, named after the Jewish religious leader, sage and scholar Hillel, is an independent Pre-K – 8 Jewish day school in Farmington Hills, Michigan, a city in the Detroit metropolitan area. Founded in 1958, it was the first non-Orthodox Jewish school in Michigan. It provides both secular and Judaic studies instruction for students from preschool through eighth grade.

History

Early years 

The Hillel Day School was established in the fall of 1958, after a long period of planning, by a group of Detroit educators, Rabbis and leaders of the community. The group was spearheaded by Rabbi Jacob Segal, who was consequently recognized as the founder of the school and its honorary life president.

The school began with 29 students in the kindergarten and first grade, a further grade being added each following year. By 1960 it grew into a modern elementary day school with 51 students in kindergarten and three grades which combined Hebraic-religious and general studies under the spiritual influence of Conservative Judaism and Zionism. By 1963, enrollment was 115 students in grades K–6. By 1966, Hillel grew up into a K–9 school and, in 1967, held the commencement exercises for its first graduating ninth grade. The next year's graduates were the first students that completed ten years of education at Hillel, from kindergarten at school's founding in 1958 to ninth grade.

1970s-1990s 

In 1970 Hillel moved to its current home in Farmington Hills. The school rapidly grew: the total enrollment went from 270 in 1970 to 533 in 1989 to 636  in 1992 (at this enrollment level, the school had to use portable classrooms) and to 712 in 1997. The school's growth was partially due to the inflow of Jewish immigrants from the Soviet Union: in 1979, Hillel had 20, and in 1992, 49 Russian students.

Hillel was recognized at the time as "a crown jewel of Conservative Judaism in Detroit" because it offered Jewish education "in a form more palatable to some for whom the Beth Yehuda seemed too oldworld". However, it was only in 1979 that Hillel formally affiliated with the Schechter Day School Network of schools that identify with Conservative Judaism.

Hillel went on as a K-9 school for 22 years from 1968 until 1988. Sometime around 1980 the ninth grade became the entry point for local public high schools, and enrollment to Hillel's ninth grade dropped. In 1988, Hillel Day School held graduation exercises for its last graduating ninth grade class. Since then, Hillel continued as a K-8 school.

Recent years 

In 2000s Hillel's enrollment tapered, from more than 760 in 2001 to 596 in 2005. The school reacted to this with several changes.

In 2008, Hillel broke off the Schechter network and reestablished itself as a community (or, non-denominational) RAVSAK Jewish day school to better attract Reform and non-religious Jewish families.

In 2010, Hillel opened the Early Childhood Center, providing in its inaugural year full- and half-day programs for 69 pre-K students. In March 2013, in its third year of operation, Hillel's ECC became the first licensed early childhood center or preschool in the Farmington or West Bloomfield area to receive a rating under the Michigan's "Great Start to Quality" program. Under the program — Michigan's new rating and improvement system for state preschools — area preschools can earn up to five stars; Hillel ECC received four stars. In 2019, the school expanded its ECC facility and started the year with 173 pre-K students. However, while the ECC grew, the school's K-8 population in 2010s was still on the decline: from 550 students in 2010 to 441 in 2017.

In 2017–2018, Hillel held a series of alumni and community events in celebration of its 60-year anniversary.

In 2020, Hillel was impacted by the COVID-19 pandemic. The school closed on March 13 after a teacher in grades 1-2 learning community tested positive for coronavirus, becoming one of Michigan's first 12 cases of the outbreak.
Soon after, another teacher — coach and gym teacher Tony Sanders — passed away due to complications from the novel coronavirus.
The school continued learning remotely; the graduating eighth graders had a "trip down Memory Lane" before their virtual graduation.
The 2020-2021 academic year started in person, with students in the classrooms; of the school's 92 teachers, eight were teaching remotely.

Governance 
Hillel Day School is a private, non-profit corporation administered by a headmaster, who in turn acts under the direction of a board of trustees. In 2009, Hillel changed its governance from the original "membership model", in which parent members elected the board, to a directorship model (self-perpetuating board), in which current board members select their own replacements.

Heads of school 
Initially, executive management of the school was carried by one of its founding members in a position of school's president. As the school grew, positions of a supervising teacher, principal, and, finally, headmaster were introduced.
 	
 Morris M. Jacobs, president (1958-c.1959)
 Mrs. Maurice Floch, supervising teacher (c.1959-c.1960)
 Naomi B. Foch, principal (c.1960-1962)
 Rabbi Abraham Zentman, principal (1962-1963)
 Rabbi Emanuel Applebaum, headmaster (1963-1965)
 Simon Murciano, headmaster (1965-1970)
 Rabbi Joshua Kronenberg, headmaster (1970-1972)
 Rabbi Chaim Rozwaski, headmaster (1972-1975)
 Rabbi Robert Abramson, headmaster (1975-1988)
 Dr. Mark Smiley, principal (1988-1990), headmaster (1990-2003)
 Steven "Steve" Freedman, headmaster (2003-2019). Under Freedman's leadership, Hillel shut down its teachers’ union (2005), instituted the eighth-grade Israel trip (2006), became a non-affiliated community Jewish day school (2008), changed its governance model to a self-perpetuating board (2009), opened and expanded the Early Childhood Center (2010, 2019), and underwent an extensive renovation of its facilities (2014-2017) that among other things included a cafe with a kitchen that allowed Hillel to start a hot lunch program.
 Nathan "Naty" Katz, interim headmaster (2019-2020)
 Dr. Darin Katz (2020–present). Prior to coming to Hillel, Katz was the director of the upper school at Jack M. Barrack Hebrew Academy in Bryn Mawr, Pennsylvania.

Teachers' union controversy 
In 2005, Hillel Day School shut down its teachers’ union. The controversial move followed a Michigan Court of Appeals ruling to block union organizers at a Roman Catholic Brother Rice High School in Bloomfield Township, Michigan, from joining the Michigan Education Association. Both schools (and many more religious schools across the country) used the same precedent to de-unionize their teachers: the National Labor Relations Board v. Catholic Bishop of Chicago case that went before the U.S. Supreme Court in 1979. In that case, the court ruled that the lay teachers at religious schools are exempt from the federal collective bargaining agreement.

At the time, Hillel Day School belonged to Schechter Day School Network of Jewish day schools that identify with Conservative Judaism.  Many conservative rabbis criticized Hillel's decision to no longer recognize its teachers’ union for the purposes of collective bargaining. Among them was Rabbi David Nelson, religious leader of the Conservative synagogue Congregation Beth Shalom in Oak Park, Michigan, who said if “you understand Jewish law, you have to have sensitivity toward the working person”. Rabbi Jill Jacobs defended the rights of workers to unionize and authored conservative movement's top lawmaking body 2008 teshuvah, or religious legal ruling, dealing with unionization and other related employment issues.

Admissions 
Since 2004, Hillel offers "lateral entry" to prospective sixth grade students who didn't have any prior Jewish education. New students are placed in separate Hebrew classes, but are otherwise integrated into the general Hillel curriculum. Prior to that, students were strongly encouraged to enter Hillel by second grade because of the school's rigorous Judaic studies component.

Hillel requires student's complete vaccination as a condition of admission and continuous enrollment. In  2015, when Michigan had one of the country's highest rate of vaccination waivers, Hillel declared it would no longer accept a religious or philosophical waiver from parents who refuse to vaccinate. Jewish authorities justify vaccination by the Jewish law principle of pikuach nefesh, which holds that the preservation of human life overrides virtually any other religious rule. "As a religious school, we can determine whether refusal of the vaccine has any religious merit, and we decided it does not," Hillel's headmaster Freedman said.

Cost of attendance 
Tuition for the 2014–2015 academic year ranged from $11,280 for kindergarten to $17,975 for grades 1–8. In 2013–2014, 54 percent of the school's 564 students received financial aid.

Curriculum 
From its founding, the school teaches Jewish and secular subjects in a dual curriculum. The Jewish curriculum includes modern Hebrew, Jewish history, Jewish prayers and holidays, the Tanakh, and Rabbinic literature. The secular curriculum follows the Michigan Department of Education academic standards.

In 2012, Prof. Andries Coetzeea from University of Michigan Linguistics Department sat in on a Hillel's 7th grade Hebrew class. The class was taught exclusively in Hebrew, except for the occasional English explanation for Andries's sake. In spite of the fact that Andries has an MA degree in Biblical Hebrew, the 7th grade Hillel students had a better command of the Hebrew language than he did.

Hillel students celebrate both American and Jewish holidays. In 2013, the first day of Hanukkah coincided with Thanksgiving. It is a rare event: the last time it happened was 1888. Hillel students integrated the two holidays — creating paper-and-paint mashups of menorahs and turkeys, and the birds combined with dreidels. In the school's library there was colorful poster designed to provoke thoughts about the convergent holidays: Under a Thanksgivvukah headline are several questions, including "How are Thanksgiving and Hanukkah alike?" Saul Rube, Hillel's dean of Judaic studies, said the light-hearted combinations of Thanksgiving and Hanukkah icons underscore a deeper bond: The Talmud, one of Judaism's core texts, describes Hanukkah as a "holiday of thanksgiving."

In 2006, the school added an eighth-grade Israel trip to the curriculum.

Campus 
The school opened in 1958 with a kindergarten and first grade in the facilities of the Hayim Greenberg Center at 19161 Schaefer, Detroit. In the next twelve years, Hillel rented space from various Jewish organisations:

In 1960, the school relocated to United Hebrew Schools at 18977 Schaefer, Detroit.
In 1962, the school moved to the Jewish Center, later known as Jimmy Prentis Morris Branch of the Jewish Community Center, at 15110 Ten Mile, Oak Park. 
In 1963, Hillel moved to Congregation B’nai Moshe.

 The era of renting came to an end in 1968, when the school broke ground on an 11-acre site in Farmington Hills. (The site included the c. 1870 German School historic building.) In 1970, a 20-room new school building was ready and Hillel moved to its current home at 32200 Middlebelt Road in Farmington Hills, with 270 students. By 1979 the school added another four classrooms.  Due to increasing enrollment and overcrowding, in 1983 the school had to start using portable classrooms. In 1986, the school added 12 more classrooms and a multi-purpose room for special events.

In 1996, an $8 million expansion and renovation added to the school a new media center, a gym, and a new school wing housing the 7–8 learning community on the second floor.
In 2006, a $4 million expansion added to the school a bigger gym doubling as a theater with 800 seats capacity, along with a new lobby, offices, and an outside playing field.

In 2014–2017, the school underwent an extensive renovation, funded by the William and Audrey Farber Philanthropic Endowment Fund.  The renovation, designed by Prakash Nair, a school architect based in Tampa, Florida, included 
the "Central Heart" (an open space with a presentation platform and capacity for 300 people), 
the "Innovation Hub" with an art studio, science lab, a greenhouse, an audio-video studio and a makerspace,
and the café and kitchen in place of the old small gym.
The existing main hallways lined with lockers and classrooms were demolished to the shell, and the spaces redesigned to create the K-2 David and Nanci Farber Learning Community, the 3–6 William Davidson Learning Community, and the 7–8 Learning Community.

The latest addition to the school building happened in 2019, when the school expanded its Early Childhood Center wing.
In 2022, a $3 million upgrade of the outdoor athletic facilities adds an all-season synthetic field, running track, and two multi-purpose athletic courts. As part of this renovation, the historic German Schoolhouse (better known as Little Red Schoolhouse) is being repurposed into a hub for athletic support.

Notable alumni 
 Mark A. Goldsmith (first graduating class of 1967), a judge of the United States District Court for the Eastern District of Michigan
 Robert Schostak (class of 1971), a political consultant and former chairman of the Michigan Republican Party
 Jeff Sudakin (class of 1985), music composer for film and TV
 Selma Blair (class of c.1986), actress
 Charles Ornstein (class of 1988), Pulitzer Prize–winning journalist
 Jaime Ray Newman (class of 1992), American actress, producer and singer, 91st Academy Awards winner
 Jeremy Moss (class of 2000), Democratic politician, Michigan Senate

See also 
 History of the Jewish people in Detroit

Notes

References

External links 
 Hillel Day School's home page
 Archive of Hillel Day School's publications: Hamakor (weekly newsletter), Divrei (annual brochure), Annual Reports, and Shulman Scholarship Journals
 

Jewish day schools in Michigan
Schools in Farmington Hills, Michigan
Private K–8 schools in Michigan
Independent School Association of the Central States
Educational institutions established in 1958
1958 establishments in Michigan